Carlo Benetton (26 December 1943 – 10 July 2018) was an Italian billionaire businessman.  He was one of the co-founders of Benetton Group, the Italian fashion brand.

In May 2015, Forbes estimated the net worth of Carlo Benetton and each of his three siblings at US$2.9 billion.

He had four children and was living in Treviso, Italy.

He died on 10 July 2018 at his home in Treviso.

References

1943 births
2018 deaths
Carlo
Italian billionaires
People from Treviso